WINC-FM (105.5 FM) is a  hot adult contemporary,   radio station licensed to Berryville, Virginia, serving the Northern Shenandoah Valley.  WINC-FM is owned by Metro Radio, Inc.

History
In November 2020, the then-WXBN flipped to hot adult contemporary, assuming the hot adult contemporary format and "WINC-FM" (pronounced "Wink FM") branding previously heard on the Winchester-based 92.5 frequency (which was in the process of being sold to the Educational Media Foundation).  The station would take over the WINC-FM legacy callsign on December 29, 2020.

On April 30, 2021, Centennial Broadcasting announced it was selling WINC-FM and sister station WZFC to Fairfax, Virginia-based Metro Radio, Inc. for $225,000.  Fellow sister station WINC was not included in the sale.  Allen B. Shaw, Centennial's President, and CEO, said in a May 2021 interview with The Winchester Star that Metro Radio, Inc. had insured Shaw "they do not intend to" change the format of WINC-FM and WZFC.  Shaw further said Metro thought WZFC's format was "probably the best format for the Winchester market" for ad revenue.

On June 30, long-time morning show host Barry Lee signed off after 37 years at the station.  Hours later, long-time afternoon host Paula Kidwell would also sign off.  The sale of WINC-FM and sister WKDV-FM was completed the same day.

On December 16, 2022, WINC-FM began stunting with Christmas music and will debut a new format on January 5, 2023, at 10:55 a.m.

References

External links
105-5 WINC-FM online

1979 establishments in Virginia
Radio stations established in 1979
INC-FM